M1907 may refer to:

 M1907 Carbine variant of the Mosin–Nagant
 M1907 Carbine variant of the Krag–Jørgensen
 Dreyse M1907 pistol
 Roth–Steyr M1907 pistol
 Schwarzlose M1907/12 machine gun
 St. Étienne Mle 1907 or "M1907"
 M1907 variant of the Presstoff pistol holder
 M1907 pistol made by Husqvarna Vapenfabrik
 Winchester Model 1907
 14-inch gun M1907 - a US Army artillery piece

See also
 M7 (disambiguation)